The Luxembourg Warmblood or  is a Luxembourgeois breed of warmblood sport horse. As with other European warmblood sport horses, admission to the stud-book is based on performance rather than parentage. Warmblood breeding within Luxembourg derives mostly from Holsteiner and Hanoverian stock imported from Germany.

From 1970 registration was through the Fédération des Stud-Books Luxembourgeois, a federation of stud-books. In 1999 it was dissolved and the Stud-Book du Cheval de Selle Luxembourgeois was established as an independent non-profit organisation.

References 

Horse breeds originating in Luxembourg